Parallel Dreams, released in 1989, is Loreena McKennitt's third album.

Track listing
All songs written by Loreena McKennitt except as noted.

 "Samain Night" – 4:27
 "Moon Cradle" (Padraic Colum, McKennitt) – 4:29
 "Huron 'Beltane' Fire Dance" – 4:20
 "Annachie Gordon" (traditional, arr. McKennitt) – 8:22
 "Standing Stones" (lyrics: traditional, music by McKennitt) – 6:56
 "Dickens' Dublin (The Palace)" – 4:40
 "Breaking the Silence" – 6:23
 "Ancient Pines" – 3:35

Song information

 "Huron 'Beltane' Fire Dance" takes its inspiration, in part, from Huron festivities and the Gaelic Beltane celebrations.
 "Breaking the Silence" was written as a tribute to Amnesty International.
 "Ancient Pines" was composed for use in the documentary film Goddess Remembered

Certifications

References

1989 albums
Loreena McKennitt albums